The Dr. P. Phillips House (also known as the Peleg Peckham House) is a historic home in Orlando, Florida. It is located at 135 Lucerne Circle, Northeast. On July 10, 1979, it was added to the U.S. National Register of Historic Places.

References

External links
 Orange County listings at National Register of Historic Places
 Orange County listings at Florida's Office of Cultural and Historical Programs

Buildings and structures in Orlando, Florida
Houses on the National Register of Historic Places in Florida
National Register of Historic Places in Orange County, Florida
Houses in Orange County, Florida
Shingle Style houses
Houses completed in 1893
Shingle Style architecture in Florida